Ana María Schultz (born October 9, 1935) is a retired female freestyle swimmer from Argentina who represented her native country at the 1952 Summer Olympics in Helsinki, Finland. She claimed a total number of five medals at the 1951 Pan American Games, and trained in Club Atlético San Lorenzo de Almagro.

References
 

1935 births
Living people
Argentine female swimmers
Argentine female freestyle swimmers
Olympic swimmers of Argentina
Swimmers at the 1951 Pan American Games
Swimmers at the 1952 Summer Olympics
Swimmers at the 1955 Pan American Games
Argentine people of German descent
Pan American Games gold medalists for Argentina
Pan American Games silver medalists for Argentina
Pan American Games bronze medalists for Argentina
Pan American Games medalists in swimming
Medalists at the 1951 Pan American Games
Medalists at the 1955 Pan American Games
20th-century Argentine women